Enighed, United States Virgin Islands may refer to:
Enighed, Saint John, United States Virgin Islands
Enighed, Saint Thomas, United States Virgin Islands